Viper Ethics is the first full-length studio album that Disco Ensemble made, released in 2003 in Finland by Fullsteam Records. The songs "Zombies" and "Videotapes" were released off it.

Track listing
 "Dynamite Days" - 3:54
 "Zombies" - 3:02
 "In Neon" - 2:40
 "Videotapes" - 4:02
 "Masquerade" - 3:33
 "Mantra" - 3:58
 "Secret Society" - 4:01
 "Cynic" - 3:52
 "Invisible Ink" - 3:39
 "Skeleton Key" - 4:00
 "Sink Your Teeth In" - 3:19

Personnel
Mikko Hakila – drums
Miikka Koivisto – vocals, keyboards
Lasse Lindfors - Bass
Jussi Ylikoski - Guitar

References

2003 albums
Disco Ensemble albums